Flying teapot may refer to:

Russell's teapot, a philosophical analogy first coined by Bertrand Russell
 Flying Teapot (album), a 1973 album by the progressive rock band Gong
The Stanley Steamer, a vehicle made by the Stanley Motor Carriage Company